Bradey is a surname. Notable people with the surname include:

Don Bradey (born 1934), American baseball player
Lydia Bradey (born 1961), New Zealand mountain climber

See also
Bradley
Brady (surname)